The Self-Government Army was a regional army in Guangxi during the Warlord era of the early 1920s.  The soldiers were primarily from the southwest of Guangxi and were largely Zhuang.  Their commanders were warlords like Lu Rongting of the Old Guangxi clique.  They were extremely jealous of their territories, where they raised and collected taxes as they wished, while carefully husbanding their forces,  refusing to cooperate with each other and were primarily interested local concerns.

See also
New Guangxi Clique

Warlord cliques in Republican China
Military history of Guangxi